Law practice management software is software designed to manage a law firm's case and client records, billing and bookkeeping, schedules and appointments, deadlines, computer files and to facilitate any compliance requirements such as with document retention policies, courts' electronic filing systems and, in the UK, the Solicitors' Accounts Rules as defined by the Solicitors Regulation Authority.

Purpose
Because law schools do not generally teach new attorneys the business skills to run a law office, many offices have turned to technology to ease the learning curve and reduce clerical errors. The American Bar Association (ABA) has found that calendar and deadline related mistakes account for most legal malpractice claims. Therefore, an initial investment in software tools can yield long-term savings in defending against such claims. In fact, the ABA has an entire section devoted entirely to law office management, of which software and related programs are an increasingly important part of its mission delivery. Many state bar associations also provide assistance and discounts to their members for such software. The main purpose of these programs is to allow a law firm to run more smoothly.

Case Management Software, used properly, improves efficiency, provides for conflict checking, and enables a law office to not have to search for the physical file each time a client calls with questions, thereby helping to reduce the need for callbacks since the client can get answers on an as needed basis at the time of their inquiry.

Types of software
Software applications have become increasingly important in modern law practice. Picking the best software for a law office depends on many variables. Attorneys/Solicitors often buy their software based on their practice area. The New Jersey State Bar Association web site lists a variety of applications by substantive law (Bankruptcy, Collections, Estate planning and administration, and Real estate) as well as by practice matter (Calendar/Schedule/Docket Control, Case & Practice Management, Document Assembly, and Document Management).

Regardless of the type of law practiced, practice management software (a form of Customer relationship management software) is among the most important. Features of practice management software include:
 Case management (databases, checking conflicts of interest and statutes of limitations)
 Time tracking (for billing)
 Document assembly
 Contact management
 Calendaring
 Docket management
 Client communication 
 Contract Management 
 Court Case Status Tracker

Other software systems that are useful for law firms include: Password security, Disk encryption, Mindmapping, desktop notes, word processing, and email management. Some firms use modified versions of Open source software.

Most law firms also subscribe to a Computer-assisted legal research database for Legal research. Such databases provide Case law from case reporters, and often other legal resources. The two largest legal databases are Westlaw (part of West, which is owned by Thomson Reuters) and LexisNexis, but other databases also exist, including the free Google Scholar, and the newer Bloomberg Law, as well as Loislaw (operated by Wolters Kluwer) and several smaller databases. Some bar associations and lawyers' organizations have their own software.

See also
 Paralegal
 iELS
 Advanced case management

References

External links
New York State Bar Association law practice management web site
State Bar of Wisconsin official web site
Legal Software Suppliers Association official web site
Law Society of England and Wales Software Solutions Guide
Washburn University School of Law - Legal Software

Legal software
Application software
Software